The JOC bombing was a suicide car bomb on June 21, 1991, during rush hour in Flower Road outside the building housing the Joint Operations Command (JOC) of the Sri Lankan Armed Forces in the suburbs of Colombo, Sri Lanka. The attack was carried out by the Liberation Tigers of Tamil Eelam (LTTE) with 60 killed including 20 civilians and 85 civilians injured.

References

1991 crimes in Sri Lanka
Attacks on civilians attributed to the Liberation Tigers of Tamil Eelam
Car and truck bombings in Sri Lanka
Massacres in Sri Lanka
Liberation Tigers of Tamil Eelam attacks in Eelam War II
Mass murder in 1991
Terrorist incidents in Sri Lanka in 1991